Maha Thu Thiri Dhammayaza (born Myo Htwe; 1842 – 17 February 1879), commonly known as the Prince of Thonze or Thonze Minthagyi, was a first-ranked royal prince of the late Konbaung dynasty. He was a senior son of King Mindon and was the Viceroy of Chindwin Province.

Early life and career
Maung Myo Htwe, the eldest of 13 siblings, was born in 1842 to the future King Mindon and his consort, Khonnaywa Mibaya. Since his mother was a descendant of Ekkathat, the last king of Ayutthaya, he was a Siamese-Burmese prince.

When his father ascended the throne, on 26 August 1853, he received the title of Thado Minsaw, and was granted the appanage of Laungshe. On 13 March 1854, he received the appanage of Thonze, and then became known as the Prince (or Myoza) of Thonze (Duke of Thonze).

In July 1854 when he was 12 years old, he underwent the Yaungdonbwe where he had his hair tied in a topknot and the Shinbyu (Coming of age) ceremonies, together with the princes of Malun, Myingun and Padein. On 15 June 1862 when he was 20, he married Yan Aung Myin Princess, a daughter of Kanaung Mintha and his consort, Khin Kye.

Later years
At the Wa-gyut Gadaw ceremony in 1862, he received the title of Maha Thu Thiri Dhammayaza from his father. He was promoted to Minthagyi, and was thereafter known as Thonze Minthagyi.

He traveled to Pegu and Rangoon on 21 March 1863. When he returned to the palace, with the help of his father, he founded the Royal Diocesan High School (present-day No. 10 Basic Education High School, Mandalay) for the royal princes.

When King Mindon fell ill in 1878, he and other senior princes who could potentially be heir to the throne were seized and thrown into prison by Hsinbyumashin who dominated the king's last days. The king was informed the situation within a week; Thonze Prince was released and was appointed as the Viceroy of Chindwin Province. But he was arrested again the following day.

He was executed on 17 February 1879 as part of the royal massacre and buried in the palace grounds.

References

Bibliography
 
 
 

1842 births
1879 deaths
Burmese Buddhists
Burmese princes
Konbaung dynasty
People executed by Myanmar